Lindsay Johnston (born 12 April 1937) is a former Australian rules football player and umpire. He played in the Western Australian National Football League (WANFL) for  before becoming a WANFL umpire. He appeared in two WANFL Grand Finals, one as a premiership-winning player and one as an umpire.

Playing career
Johnston began his football in Kalgoorlie, where he played for Kalgoorlie Railways. In 1961 he only secured a regular spot late in the regular season but played in all of the club's finals, including the grand final. After a back injury early in 1962 he retired having played 27 league matches.

He made a return to football for Herne Hill (now Swan Athletic) for the 1968 season.

Umpiring career
After beginning umpiring country football, Johnston made his league debut in 1965. After taking 1968 off to play football, he returned to league football the following year. He was appointed to the 1971 WANFL Grand Final. Johnston retired from umpiring after the 1972 WANFL season.

References

1937 births
Australian rules footballers from Western Australia
Swan Districts Football Club players
Kalgoorlie Railways Football Club players
West Australian Football League umpires
Living people